The large-scaled banded gecko (Pachydactylus macrolepis) is a species of lizard in the family Gekkonidae. It is found in South Africa.

References

Pachydactylus
Reptiles described in 1939
Reptiles of South Africa